Steffen Yeates (born January 4, 2000) is a Canadian soccer player who plays as a midfielder for Canadian Premier League side Pacific FC.

Early life
Yeates began his youth career with Vaughan SC. In 2013, he joined the Toronto FC Academy.

College career
In 2018, he attended the University of Connecticut, joining the men's soccer team. He scored his first goal against the University of Cincinnati.

In 2019, he transferred to Oregon State University and joined their men's soccer team. He scored his first goal on September 15 against the UC Santa Barbara Gauchos.

Club career

Toronto FC
While with Toronto FC Academy, he debuted with Toronto FC III in League1 Ontario in 2016. He scored his first goal on June 19, 2016 against Durham United FA.

He made his professional debut with Toronto FC II in the USL on April 26, 2018 against the Richmond Kickers, as an academy call-up. In 2019, he was close to an agreement with Danish club FC Helsingør, but decided against it at the last minute. In 2020, he went on trial with French club US Boulogne. He signed his first professional contract with Toronto FC II on April 22, 2021 ahead of the 2021 season. 

On May 4, 2022, he signed a short-term four-day loan with the first team, Toronto FC of Major League Soccer. He made his debut that same day, as a second half substitute, in their match against FC Cincinnati. He signed an additional four-day loan on May 7.

Pacific FC
In December 2022, Yeates signed a multi-year contract with Pacific FC of the Canadian Premier League, beginning in 2023.

International career
Yeates played for the Canada U17 team at the 2017 CONCACAF U-17 Championship in 2017, where he started in all three of the team's matches.

In 2018, he was part of the Canada U20 team at the 2018 CONCACAF U-20 Championship where he scored a goal and an assist in his single appearance against Martinique.

Career statistics

Club

References

2001 births
Living people
Canadian soccer players
Association football defenders
Toronto FC players
Toronto FC II players
Soccer players from Toronto
Vaughan Azzurri players
USL League One players
USL Championship players
MLS Next Pro players
Major League Soccer players
Canada men's youth international soccer players
Pacific FC players